Shelby Lyons (born May 24, 1981 in Oswego, New York) is an American retired competitive figure skater who competed in both singles and pairs. She originally competed as a single skater on the novice level before teaming up with Brian Wells. They won four medals at the United States Figure Skating Championships between 1995 and 1998, and competed twice at the World Figure Skating Championships, placing 10th in 1996 and in 1998. Their partnership ended in 1998. During this time, Lyons had been competing in singles. She was the 1996 U.S. Junior national champion in singles and had competed on the Junior Grand Prix. Following the end of the partnership, Lyons went back to focusing on skating singles. She has since retired and has skated professionally on Disney on Ice. She now teaches singles, pairs, and dance in Colorado.

Results
Ladies' Singles

(Pairs with Brian Wells)

References

 Pairs on Ice: Lyons & Wells

1981 births
American female pair skaters
People from Oswego, New York
Living people
21st-century American women
20th-century American women